Lemurosicyos is a monotypic genus of flowering plants belonging to the family Cucurbitaceae. The only species is Lemurosicyos variegatus.

Its native range is Madagascar.

References

Cucurbitaceae
Monotypic Cucurbitaceae genera
Taxa named by Alfred Cogniaux